State Funeral is a 2019 internationally co-produced documentary film by Ukrainian filmmaker Sergei Loznitsa. It examines the ceremony and aftermath of Joseph Stalin, dictator of the Union of Soviet Socialist Republics from 1929 to his death in 1953.

Individuals shown in archive footage
 Joseph Stalin
 Lavrentiy Beria
 Nikita Khrushchev
 Georgy Malenkov
 Vyacheslav Molotov
 Dolores Ibárruri
 Enlai Zhou
 Yumjaagiin Tsedenbal
 Valko Chervenkov

Release
State Funeral premiered at the 76th Venice International Film Festival on 6 September 2019, and the Toronto International Film Festival a week later on the 13th. It saw theatrical exhibition in Lithuania starting on 22 November 2019, and continued through film festivals and other territories before a limited release in the United States on 7 May 2021, before a streaming release on MUBI two weeks later, available also in Australia, Canada, Ireland, India, Latin America, New Zealand, Turkey and the United Kingdom.

Reception
On review aggregator website Rotten Tomatoes, the film has an approval rating of 88% based on 25 reviews, with an average rating of 7.20/10. The website's critical consensus reads, "If State Funeral risks repetitiveness in its patient approach, the glimpse of history it offers remains a fascinating -- and frightening -- look at life under a totalitarian regime." Metacritic reports a weighted average score of 81 out of 100, based on 10 critics, indicating "universal acclaim".

References

External links
 

Dutch documentary films
Lithuanian documentary films
2019 documentary films
2010s Russian-language films
Documentary films about the Soviet Union
Documentary films about the Soviet Union in the Stalin era
Films about Joseph Stalin
Russian-language films